NOC is allowed to enter 1 men's and 1 women's qualified team in volleyball tournaments and 2 men's and 2 women's qualified teams in beach volleyball tournaments.

Indoor Volleyball

Men

* The Asian Olympic Qualification Tournament is combined with the World Olympic Qualification Tournament 3. The winner of the tournament will qualify as the champion of the World Olympic Qualification Tournament 3 while the best Asian team except the winner will qualify as the Asian Olympic Qualification Tournament champion.

World Cup

African Qualification Tournament

European Qualification Tournament

Elimination round

Pre-Qualification Tournaments

Tournament 1

Tournament 2

Tournament 3

Qualification Tournament

North American Qualification Tournament

South American Qualification Tournament

World Qualification Tournaments

Tournament 1

Tournament 2

Tournament 3

* Japan is counted as The Asian Continental Qualification Tournament Champion since it is the best Asian team except the winner.

Women

''* The Asian Olympic qualification tournament and the World Olympic Qualification Tournament are combined into one event. The top 3 teams at the tournament will qualify as the medallists of the World Olympic Qualification Tournament while the best Asian team outside the top 3 will qualify as the Asian Olympic Qualification Tournament champion.

World Cup

African Qualification Tournament

European Qualification Tournament

Pre-Qualification Tournaments

Tournament 1

Tournament 2

Tournament 3

Qualification Tournament

North American Qualification Tournament

South American Qualification Tournament

World Qualification Tournament

* Kazakhstan is counted as The Asian Continental Qualification Tournament Champion since it is the best Asian team outside the top 3.

Beach Volleyball

Qualifying criteria
The main qualifying criteria were the FIVB Beach Volleyball Olympic Ranking lists as of July 21, 2008. It provided a total of 24 pairs in each event. Each NOC was allowed to enter 2 men's and 2 women's qualified teams in beach volleyball tournaments. Each continent and Host nation is guaranteed one entry in each event. If this is not satisfied by the entry selection method, the highest ranking player/pair will be qualified.

Qualifiers

Men

* Matteo Varnier is replaced by Eugenio Amore on the Italian team, because of an injury to Varnier.

H = Host Country Quota
C = Continental Quota

Women

* Austrian team Montagnolli - Swoboda is replaced by the Swiss team Kuhn - Schwer, because of medical reasons.

H = Host Country Quota
C = Continental Quota

References

Federation Internationale de Volleyball
Olympic Beach Volleyball Qualification Men, Women

Volleyball qualification for the 2008 Summer Olympics
Qualification for the 2008 Summer Olympics